The Knob is a mountain in Greene County, New York. It is located in the Catskill Mountains north-northeast of Ashland. Ashland Pinnacle is located north, and Huntersfield Mountain is located northwest of The Knob.

References

Mountains of Greene County, New York
Mountains of New York (state)